The 2009 Arab League summit was held in Doha, Qatar on March 30, 2009. The Arab League defied the International Criminal Court by giving a "warm welcome" to Sudanese President Omar Hassan al-Bashir, whom the Court placed on warrant of arrest for war crimes in the Darfur genocide.

Reactions
Egyptian President Hosni Mubarak boycotted the summit amid differences with Qatar stemming from the 2008–2009 Israel–Gaza conflict. Other Arab countries like Saudi Arabia were also hesitant to come to the summit if Iran or Hamas were in attendance (neither of the parties came while the Saudis did).

Incidents
After Sheikh Hamad bin Khalifa Al Thani speech, Libyan leader Muammar al-Gaddafi called King Abdullah of Saudi Arabia a liar, accusing him of "bringing the Americans to occupy Iraq" and of being "made by Britain and protected by the US.", while stating: "I am an international leader, the dean of the Arab rulers, the king of kings of Africa and the imam (leader) of Muslims, and my international status does not allow me to descend to a lower level". He then invited the King to visit him to solve the issues between the two.

References

2009 Arab League summit
2009 in politics
Doha
Diplomatic conferences in Qatar
2009 in Qatar
21st-century diplomatic conferences (MENA)
2009 in international relations
2009 conferences
21st century in Doha
March 2009 events in Asia